Ritas Welt (English: Rita's World) is a German television sitcom produced by the German division of Columbia TriStar Television that premiered on RTL on 17 September 1999 and ended its run after five successful seasons on 19 December 2003. Starring Gaby Köster, the show was about a confident sales assistant, Rita Kruse; her fight with her self-righteous boss, Achim Schuhmann (Lutz Herkenrath); and her life with her loving husband Horst (Frank Vockroth) and their two children, Sandra (Jasmin Schwiers) and Markus (Marius Theobald). Through it all, Rita is supported by her wacky best friend Gisi Wiemers (Franziska Traub).

See also
List of German television series

External links
 

1999 German television series debuts
2003 German television series endings
German comedy television series
German-language television shows
RTL (German TV channel) original programming
Grimme-Preis for fiction winners